anaROBIK is the name given to an electropop computer-generated female vocalist created by British programmer Robert Hedin and accompanied by American multi-instrumentalist Bobby Trempealeau of Minneapolis, Minnesota.

"ana", as the character is called, was created using Yamaha's Vocaloid software, and specifically the "Lola" voice.

History
Hedin was formerly a member of the group Sister Friction, describing it on anaROBIK's website as yearning to be the "queerest pop band in the world". He conceived the new "vocalist" project in 2007, releasing the first album in 2010, followed by a remix album in 2011.  The artist's website sets expectations for anaROBIK to "create musical compositions consisting of catchy melodies and body-friendly rhythms".  Another stated goal is that "womanual [sic] performances by ana" as well as the computer performances "shall be used to create a rich and warm melding of woman and machine".

Technical details
anaROBIK's musical sounds are entirely synthesized, consisting of samples from the Moog Voyager, Roland Juno-60, Yamaha FS1R and SY85 and E-mu Audity 2000 and Emax, among others.  Drums are mostly samples from Native Instruments' Battery library.

anaROBIK's recordings are mastered with a minimum of audio compression to avoid sounding "like crap".

Discography
 Operator's Manual (2010)
 Operator's Manual Addendum: The Remixes (2011)

References

External links
 

Culture of Minneapolis
Music software
Vocaloids introduced in 2007